The Colomban MC-100 Ban-Bi is a French amateur-built aircraft that was designed by Michel Colomban. The aircraft is supplied as plans for amateur construction with some parts and sub assemblies available.

The name Ban-Bi combines Ban from the designer's surname, Colomban, and Bi from the French "biplace", meaning two seats.

Design and development
The MC-100 features a cantilever low-wing, a two-seats-in-side-by-side configuration enclosed cockpit under a bubble canopy, a T-tail, fixed tricycle landing gear and a single engine in tractor configuration.

The standard engine used is the  Rotax 912UL four-stroke powerplant. The cockpit is described by reviewers Roy Beisswenger and Marino Boric as "snug, but adequate"

The aircraft is built from plans, with the wings constructed at the factory by the builder with assistance. Sub-assemblies and parts are available from both Dyn'Aéro in France and Arplast.

The MC-100 was developed into a whole series of derivative designs, the Dyn'Aéro MCR01 series.

Specifications (MC-100 Ban-Bi)

See also

References

External links

Photo of a Colomban MC-100 Ban-Bi

Homebuilt aircraft
Single-engined tractor aircraft
Low-wing aircraft